The 1994 Vienna Cup took place on in Vienna. Skaters competed in the disciplines of men's singles, ladies' singles, and ice dancing.

Results

Men

Ladies

References

Karl Schäfer Memorial
Karl Schafer Memorial, 1994
Karl Schafer Memorial